Ellerker is a village and civil parish in the East Riding of Yorkshire, England.

According to the 2011 UK Census, Ellerker parish had a population of 307, a decrease on the 2001 UK Census figure of 320. Ellerker lies within the Parliamentary constituency of Haltemprice and Howden an area that mainly consists of middle class suburbs, towns and villages. The area is affluent and has one of the highest proportions of owner-occupiers in the country.

'Ellerker' means a "marsh where alder trees grow", from Old English alor or aler "alder" and Old Norse kjarr "marsh". The name was recorded as Alrecher in the 11th century and Alekirr in 1139. Same name as Orcher (Normandy, Aurichier 12th century).

In 1823 Ellerker was in the parish of Brantingham and the Wapentake of Howdenshire. Village population was 249, including eight farmers, a corn miller, a shopkeeper, a tailor, a shoemaker, and a carpenter. Also listed in directories were three yeomen and a curate of the village church. Once a week a carrier operated from the village to Hull and Wilton.

The village church is dedicated to St Anne and is designated as a Grade II listed building.

Sir Rafe Ellerker is cited in Part 1 of title 'The Last Years of a Frontier' - DLW Tough, concerning his survey of the Border Marches 1541.

References

External links

Ellerker Parish website

Villages in the East Riding of Yorkshire
Civil parishes in the East Riding of Yorkshire